Parallel parking is a method of parking a vehicle parallel to the road, in line with other parked vehicles. Parallel parking usually requires initially driving slightly past the parking space, parallel to the parked vehicle in front of that space, keeping a safe distance, then followed by reversing into that space. Subsequent position adjustment may require the use of forward and reverse gears.

Techniques
Parallel parking is considered to be one of the most stressful and difficult skills for new drivers to learn. While parallel parking is a required part of most driving tests, several states in the US have dropped it as a requirement.

Parallel parking enables the driver to park a vehicle in a smaller space than would be true of forward parking. Driving forward into a parking space on the side of a road is typically not possible unless two or more successive parking spaces are empty. Reversing into the spot via the parallel parking technique allows one to take advantage of a single empty space not much longer than the car (in order to complete the parking within three wheel-turns the parking space would generally need to be about one and a half car-length long).

New drivers learn to use reference points to align themselves in relation to the car in front of the space, to determine the proper angle for backing, and to determine when to turn the steering wheel while backing. They may find it easier to briefly stop at each reference point and turn for the next step.

Steps
Two major types of parallel parking technique differ in whether they will use two or three positions of the steering wheel while backing. A skilled driver is theoretically able to parallel park by having their car move along two arcs, the first having its center on the parking side of the car and the second having its center on the other side. There will be a point in the transition between these curves where all the car's wheels will be parallel with each other. Less-confident drivers may choose to drive further while transitioning, making it a pronounced middle step of three. Such a step allows greater tolerances to avoid hitting anything, but forces the car to start further from the road's edge and requires more space to the rear.

Road infrastructure
Roads that facilitate parallel parking have an extra lane or a large shoulder for parked cars. It is also employed whenever parking facilities are not available—usually in large metropolitan areas where there is a high density of vehicles and few (or restricted) accommodations such as multi-storey car parks.

Many traffic regulators restrict parallel parking during rush hour, freeing up an extra traffic lane.  Historically, metered parallel parking had individual meters for each parking spot with spots clearly marked on the road.  Some regulators have eliminated individual spots allowing shorter vehicles to use less space.  Individual meters are then also replaced with a centralized parking ticket machine.

Beyond taking up a lane of traffic, on-street parking further reduces road capacity as remaining traffic slows to interact with cars moving in and out of parallel parking spaces, car doors opening and pedestrians.

This inconvenience can be eliminated by providing shoulders.

Computer Assisted Parallel Parking

Beginning in the early 2000's, automobile manufacturers began providing computer assisted automatic parking software on some models that allowed drivers to engage the software to complete the parallel parking maneuver hands-free. Depending on the system, the automatic parking feature controls the steering while the driver operates the accelerator and brakes, or the software handles both steering and accelerator.

Legality
In Japan, there is a ban on on-street parking, with a few exceptions (such as daytime and evening parking). In addition to this, there is a proof-of-parking rule and motorists are required to present a garage certificate ("Shako shomei sho") to prove that they have a garage before being allowed to register a car.

History
In the 1930s cars were developed with a fifth wheel, in between the two rear wheels and perpendicular to them, which could be lowered to the ground and used to drive sideways into a parallel parking spot. This innovation was intended to make parallel parking much easier, but it never became popular.

See also

 Advanced Parking Guidance System
 Automatic parking
 Door zone
 Parallel parking problem: the mathematics of parallel parking
 Removal of curbside parking spaces: frees up space for bicycle lanes
 Perpendicular parking or bay parking

References

Driving techniques
Parking